Dan Laughlin is a Pennsylvania politician. A Republican, he is the Pennsylvania State Senator for the 49th district. Before his election to the State Senate in 2016, Laughlin worked as a homebuilder.

Political Positions
Laughlin is the first Pennsylvania Republican to endorse the legalization of adult-use cannabis in Pennsylvania.

References

External links
Dan Laughlin for Senate

Living people
Republican Party Pennsylvania state senators
Year of birth missing (living people)
21st-century American politicians